Philip J. King (March 26, 1925 – December 7, 2019) was an American Roman Catholic priest, historian, and archaeologist.

Life
King was born in Newton, Massachusetts. He graduated in 1945 from Saint John's Seminary in Boston. King was ordained to the priesthood on May 4, 1949 by Archbishop Richard Cushing of the Roman Catholic Archdiocese of Boston. He earned higher degrees: a Licentiate of Sacred Theology (STL) in 1954 from Catholic University of America in Washington, D.C., a Licentiate of Sacred Scripture (SSL) in 1957 from Pontifical Biblical Institute, and a Doctor of Sacred Theology (STD) 1959 from Pontifical Lateran University in Rome. King also served in several parishes in the Boston Archdiocese. King died at the Regina Cleri Residence in Boston, Massachusetts.

He held a professorship in biblical studies in the Department of Theology at Boston College from 1974 until his retirement in 2001.

In 2006, the foundation created from the estate of Leon Levy established the Philip J. King Professorship at Harvard University, to support a scholar who will use an interdisciplinary approach to advance the understanding of ancient civilizations in the Near East and the Mediterranean.

Bibliography
 The Bible Is for Living: A Scholar's Spiritual Journey
 Amos, Hosea, Micah: An Archaeological Commentary
 Jeremiah: An Archaeological Companion
 With Lawrence Stager:
 Life in Biblical Israel (in Library of Ancient Israel series)

Notes

References

Saint John's Seminary (Massachusetts) alumni
Boston College faculty
Catholic University of America alumni
Pontifical Lateran University alumni
1925 births
2019 deaths
Writers from Newton, Massachusetts
American Roman Catholic priests
Roman Catholic Archdiocese of Boston
21st-century American historians
21st-century American male writers
Pontifical Biblical Institute alumni
American male non-fiction writers